Time to Change was a mental health campaign in England, launched in 2007 with the objective of reducing mental health-related stigma and discrimination. Time to Change closed on 31 March 2021.

Description
Time to Change (TTC) was formed in 2007 by mental health charities MIND and Rethink Mental Illness, aiming to reduce mental health-related stigma and discrimination. A specific objective was to reduce stigma and discrimination by 5 per cent in the first 12 months. The first four years were funded by grants of £20.5 million from the Big Lottery Fund and Comic Relief.

TTC also asked organisations and individuals to sign a pledge supporting its anti-stigma programme. Organisations signing the pledge include the Bank of England, the Financial Conduct Authority, British Gas, British Telecom, Lloyds Banking Group, Ernst & Young, E.ON, PepsiCo and parts of the National Health Service. A pledge event took place at the Houses of Parliament in October 2013, giving MPs an opportunity to sign up.

In 2011, TTC launched a four-week television advertising campaign to promote its new slogan: "It's time to talk. It's Time to Change."

The campaign was fronted by a number of celebrities, including political strategist Alastair Campbell, presenter Davina McCall, singers Shojon, Frankie Sandford, and boxer Ricky Hatton. In 2014, the campaign supported the "Laughing for a Change" project run by actress Janice Connolly, which aimed to promote awareness of mental health through a stand-up comedy tour.

Outcomes
An academic study was carried out to measure whether TTC had met their 5 per cent target in the first 12 months. The study measured "progress toward meeting TTC's target of a 5 per cent reduction in discrimination".

An independent evaluation of the campaign's first four years took place in 2013. Though it found a reduction in discrimination from friends and families, change in attitudes from health professionals was negligible.

Time to Change closed on 31 March 2021, having lost its sources of funding.

Wales
In Wales the campaign was launched in 2012 under the name Time to Change Wales, led by Welsh mental health charities MIND Cymru, Gofal and Hafal.

See also 
 Mental health in the United Kingdom

References

External links
 Time to Change - let's end mental health discrimination

Mental health in England
Mental health organisations in the United Kingdom
Health campaigns
Organisations based in London